Evergestis lupalis is a species of moth in the family Crambidae. It is found in Spain.

The wingspan is 26–33 mm. Adults are on wing in July.

Subspecies
Evergestis lupalis lupalis (Spain: Sierra Nevada)
Evergestis lupalis poecilalis Zerny, 1935 (Spain: Sierra de Gredos)

References

Moths described in 1928
Evergestis
Moths of Europe